Victoria Dock railway station (also known as Victoria station) was the terminus of the York and North Midland Railway's Victoria Dock Branch Line in Kingston upon Hull, East Riding of Yorkshire, England.

It was opened by the York and North Midland Railway on 1 June 1853 and was closed to passengers on 1 June 1864.

The station remained in use as Drypool Goods station, with much of the station structure removed by the early 1900s. Some station office buildings adjacent to Hedon Road remained until the 1980s.

History
In 1853, the Victoria Dock Branch Line was opened by the York and North Midland Railway (Y&NMR) to serve the new Victoria Dock (1850). William Botterill was employed by the Y&NMR to design the stations on the branch.

In January 1853 the company planned to build a goods shed at the dock, with the intention to use it temporarily for passengers. A station to Botterill's design was approved in the following months and later that year the Hull and Holderness Railway became a joint user of the station on agreeing to pay half the cost for its development.

Initially a temporary station was built. The Y&NMR and Hull&Holderness agreed to share the costs of a larger permanent station in mid 1854. The station was constructed on the south side of Hedon Road, between Emily and Williamson streets.

The station was used by passenger services on the Victoria Dock Branch from 1853 to 1854, and by the Hull and Holderness Railway till 1864.

The station site was later used for freight, as the Drypool Goods station. In the late 1880s the NER contracted the construction of a goods shed at the station. Much of the passenger station had been by removed by 1910, leaving some station buildings facing onto Hedon Road.

During the Hull Blitz the station was hit by bombs three times, with the station's stables set on fire on one occasion.

Remnants of the passenger station buildings remained up to the 1980s.

Notes

References

Locations

Sources

External links

Disused railway stations in Kingston upon Hull
Railway stations in Great Britain opened in 1853
Railway stations in Great Britain closed in 1864
Former York and North Midland Railway stations
Hull and Holderness Railway